The 31st Kisei is being held from May 2006 to March 22, 2007. The following players earned spots through not being eliminated in the group stage: Satoshi Yuki (5-0), Tomoyasu Mimura (3-2), Kato Atsushi (3-2), Kobayashi Satoru (3-2), Komatsu Hideki (3-2), Norimoto Yoda (2-3), and O Rissei (2-3). Cho U, Kunihisa Honda, O Meien, and Toshiya Imamura were eliminated from group play and had to earn a spot through preliminary stages. The players to have qualified through preliminary tournaments are Cho U, Kunihisa Honda, Cho Chikun, and Toshiya Imamura. Naoki Hane, the loser of the 30th Kisei takes the place of holder Keigo Yamashita in the group stage. Players who end with the two lowest records in the each league are eliminated from automatic berth into the next tournament while the 3 other players who were not eliminated or had the top record are given a place in the following years groups.

Keigo Yamashita swept his opponent for the second time in as many years.

Preliminaries

Group A

Group B

Group C

Group D

Main tournament

Group A

* Naoki Hane held the tiebreaker over Cho U.

** Hideki Komatsu and Norimoto Yoda held tiebreakers over Kunihisa Honda.

Group B

*** Satoru Kobayashi held the tiebreaker over Atsushi Kato.

Key:
Green - Winner of group; earns a spot in the challenger final.
Blue - Earns a place in the next edition's group stage.
Red - Eliminated from automatic berth; must qualify through preliminary stages.

Challenger finals

Finals

Key
W+ - Won by
R - Resignation

2007 in go
Kisei (Go)
2007 in Japan
2006 in go
2006 in Japan